Scrobipalpa grisea is a moth of the family Gelechiidae. It is found in Russia (Middle Volga and southern Ural and Siberia: Tuva), Korea, Mongolia and China (Inner Mongolia).

References

Moths described in 1969
Taxa named by Dalibor Povolný
Scrobipalpa